Afarian-e Sofla (also Romanized as Āfarīān-e Soflá; also known as Āfarīān-e Pā'īn and Āfarīn-e Pā'īn) is a village in Zhavehrud Rural District, in the Central District of Kamyaran County, Kurdistan Province, Iran. At the 2006 census, its population was 15, in 5 families. The village is populated by Kurds.

References 

Towns and villages in Kamyaran County
Kurdish settlements in Kurdistan Province